Pizzo Ruscada is a mountain of the Lepontine Alps, overlooking Borgnone in the Swiss canton of Ticino. It lies on the range between the valley of Onsernone (north) and Centovalli (south).

References

External links

 Pizzo Ruscada on Hikr

Mountains of the Alps
Two-thousanders of Switzerland
Mountains of Ticino
Lepontine Alps
Mountains of Switzerland